Bernhard Christensen   (Copenhagen, 9 March 1906 – 20 March 2004) was a Danish composer and organist.

He studied music at University of Copenhagen from 1926. In 1929 he graduated and was organist until 1945 at Christiansborg Palace Church. Then he was hired as organist by Vangede Church from 1945 to 1976. He also worked as a music teacher from 1950 to 1976, notably for young jazz enthusiasts in a kindergarten.

References
This article was initially translated from the Danish Wikipedia.

Danish classical organists
Male classical organists
1906 births
2004 deaths
Danish jazz composers
Composers for pipe organ
20th-century organists
Male jazz composers
20th-century Danish male musicians
20th-century jazz composers